Luxol fast blue stain, abbreviated LFB stain or simply LFB, is a commonly used stain to observe myelin under light microscopy, created by Heinrich Klüver and Elizabeth Barrera in 1953. LFB is commonly used to detect demyelination in the central nervous system (CNS), but cannot discern myelination in the peripheral nervous system.

Procedure
Luxol fast blue is a copper phthalocyanine dye that is soluble in alcohol and is attracted to bases found in the lipoproteins of the myelin sheath.

Under the stain, myelin fibers appear blue, neuropil appears pink, and nerve cells appear purple. Tissues sections are treated over an extended period of time (usually overnight) and then differentiated with a lithium carbonate solution.

Combination methods
The combination of LFB with a variety of common staining methods provides the most useful and reliable method for the demonstration of pathological processes in the CNS. It is often combined with H&E stain (hematoxylin and eosin), which is abbreviated H-E-LFB, H&E-LFB. Other common staining methods include the periodic acid-Schiff, Oil Red O, phosphotungstic acid, and Holmes silver nitrate method.

Disease states
Studies have demonstrated that in both, human and mice, traumatic brain injury is associated with ongoing white matter degeneration with survival > 1 year post-injury.

See also
Bielschowsky stain

References

Staining
Histology
Histochemistry